This is a list of commanding officers of US I Corps in its operational history.

Commanding officers

References 

.

Lists of United States military unit commanders
United States Army officers
Corps of the United States Army